Paul M. Rosen is an American attorney and government official who is the current assistant secretary of the treasury for investment security.

Education 
Rosen earned a Bachelor of Arts degree from the University of Colorado Boulder and a Juris Doctor from the USC Gould School of Law.

Career 
In 2005 and 2006, Rosen served as a law clerk for Judge Gary Allen Feess. From 2006 to 2009, he served as counsel to then-Senator Joe Biden during Biden's tenure as chair of the United States Senate Committee on the Judiciary. In 2010 and 2011, Rosen served as special assistant United States attorney for the Eastern District of Virginia. Rosen joined the United States Department of Justice Criminal Division in 2009, serving as counsel to the assistant attorney general until 2011 and trial attorney in the Securities and Financial Fraud Unit. In 2013 and 2014, Rosen served as chief of staff of U.S. Immigration and Customs Enforcement. He then joined the United States Department of Homeland Security, serving as deputy chief of staff and later chief of staff for then-Secretary Jeh Johnson. From 2017 to 2019, Rosen was a senior fellow at the Harvard Kennedy School. He also worked as an agency review team member of the Biden-Harris Transition Team. Since 2017, he has been a partner at Crowell & Moring.

Biden administration
On March 8, 2022, President Joe Biden nominated Rosen to be an Assistant Secretary of the Treasury. Hearings were held before the Senate Banking Committee on April 6, 2022. The committee favorably reported the nomination to the Senate floor on May 4, 2022. The entire Senate confirmed Rosen via voice vote on May 24, 2022.

Personal life 
In 2018, Rosen married Casey Hernandez, the vice president for content strategy at Herbalife Nutrition.

References 

Living people
American lawyers
California lawyers
University of Colorado Boulder alumni
USC Gould School of Law alumni
United States Department of Justice officials
United States Department of Justice lawyers
U.S. Immigration and Customs Enforcement officials
United States Department of Homeland Security officials
Biden administration personnel
United States Department of the Treasury officials
Lawyers from Los Angeles
Year of birth missing (living people)